West Harnham Chalk Pit is a 2.8 hectare geological Site of Special Scientific Interest in Wiltshire, England, notified in 1971. Although named for the West Harnham area in the southwest of the city of Salisbury, the site lies in Netherhampton civil parish.

The site is now commonly used by BMX and MTB enthusiasts as a place to exercise their skill on the many formed jumps.

Sources
 English Nature citation sheet for the site (accessed 25 July 2006)

External links
 English Nature website (SSSI information)

Sites of Special Scientific Interest in Wiltshire
Sites of Special Scientific Interest notified in 1971